The Enterprise Challenge Fund (ECF) for the Pacific and South-East Asia was a A$20.5 million pilot program funded by Australia (through AusAID) commencing in July 2007 that ran for six years, concluding in October 2013. It provided A$11.012 million in grants to help commercialize innovative business ideas in low-income markets, with a focus on innovative solutions that addressed market failures. It ran through competitive rounds and was overseen by a private sector board. 21 businesses were funded. It used a challenge fund model and called for proposals in multiple rounds.

A$11.012 million was granted to 22 projects in Cambodia, East Timor, Fiji, Laos, Papua New Guinea, southern Philippines, Solomon Islands and Vanuatu.

See also 
 AusAID
 Private Sector Development

References

Grants (money)
International development programs